Tsorins, Tsori, also Ghalghaï (ГIалгIай) — historical Ingush ethnoterritorial society that was located in mountainous Ingushetia in the region of river Guloykhi. The center of the society was Tsori from which it got its name. Tsorin society, like the Khamkhin society, was formed from the former "Galgaï society" as a result of the transfer (appearance) of rural government to the village Tsori.

Etymology 
According to Suleymanov, the word "Tshoroy" may originate from the word Tshar (. Tshar is mail mesh helmet that covers the face and neck of a warrior.

History 
In 1832, due to the collaboration of Ingush with Kazi-Mulla and the murder of a bailiff, Rozen led a punitive expedition on Ingush and went through Dzheyrakh and Metskhal around Khamkhi and Tsori. During the Caucasian War, Tsorins (as well as other Ingush societies) were considered half-conquered by the Russian Empire. This was witnessed by Russian cavalry colonel and military-historian of German background, A. L. Zisserman, who in 1848 went through Tsori and reported that he had to stealthily pass it and follow precautions. After the end of Caucasian war, Tsorins were part of Ingushkiy okrug.

In 1883, Tsorin society consisted completely of Ghalghaï (Ingush).

Composition 
Tsorin society consisted of following settlements:
 Tsori
 Agutyr
 Arshaug
 Besht
 Biyre
 Gorshke
 Gul
 Kashete
 Koyrakh
 Lyazhg
 Oaseg
 Vitsy
 Gvezi

References

Bibliography 
 
 
 
 
 
 

History of Ingushetia
Ingush societies